Sydney Pontifex (8 February 1803 – August 1874) was an English cricketer who made his first-class debut in 1829, playing for an All-England team.

References

1803 births
1874 deaths
English cricketers
English cricketers of 1826 to 1863
Non-international England cricketers